The 4th Japan Record Award was held on December 27, 1962.

Emcee
Takayuki Akutagawa
3rd time as the emcee of JRA.

Award Winners

Japan Record Award
 Yukio Hashi & Sayuri Yoshinaga for "Itsudemo Yume Wo" 
 Lyricist: Takao Saeki
 Composer: Tadashi Yoshida
 Arranger: Tadashi Yoshida
 Record Company: JVC Victor

Vocalist Award
Michiya Mihashi for "Hoshikuzu No Machi"

New Artist Award
Saburō Kitajima for "Namida Fune"
Chieko Baisho for "Shitamachi No Taiyou"

Composer Award
Hachidai Nakamura for "Tooku E Ikitai"
Singer: Jerry Fujio

Arranger Award
Makoto Saeki for "Koi No Manjuushake"
Singer: Hibari Misora

Planning Award
EMI Music Japan for "Sudara Bushi" and "Hai Soremadeo"
Singer: Hitoshi Ueki

Children's Song Award
Bonny Jacks for "Chisai Aki Mitsumete"

Special Award
Hideo Murata for "Oushou"
Sachiko Nishida for "Acacia No Ame Ga Yamu Toki"

New Composer Award
Takao Yamashita for "TBS Shichinin No Keiji's Theme"

New Lyricist Award
Kazuko Wakaya for "Obento Tsukete Dokoikuno"
Singer: Toshie Kusunoki

References

Japan Record Awards
Japan Record Awards
Japan Record Awards
1962